Alfa Radio was a private radio station broadcasting in the Municipality of Radoviš, North Macedonia, with its headquarters located in the city of Radoviš. It started broadcasting on 1 May 2002, and since then it is one of the most listened radios in Radoviš. Alfa Radio is broadcasting on 98.3 FM in the Radoviš municipality and live on the internet.

The radio stopped its program on 7 October 2010.

See also
 List of radio stations in North Macedonia

Radio stations in North Macedonia
Radio stations established in 2002
Mass media in Radoviš
2002 establishments in the Republic of Macedonia
2010 disestablishments in the Republic of Macedonia
Radio stations disestablished in 2010
Defunct mass media in North Macedonia